The Dogwalker is a 1999 American romantic comedy-drama film written and directed by Paul Duran and starring Will Stewart.

Cast
Will Stewart as Jerry Cooper
Nicki Aycox as Susan Shulte
Carol Gustafson as Alma Mathers
Walter Emanuel Jones as Blonde
Stepfanie Kramer as Helen Shulte
John Randolph as Ike Noodleman
Allan Rich as Sam Steele
Tony Todd as Mones
Cress Williams as K.C.
Stacey Williams as Darlene

Release
The film premiered at the Karlovy Vary International Film Festival in 1999.  Then it was released on September 13, 2002.

Reception
The film has a 50% rating on Rotten Tomatoes based on ten reviews.

Lael Loewenstein of Variety gave the film a positive review, calling it "an indie that benefits from amusing characters, strong thesping and taut situational humor."

Manohla Dargis of the Los Angeles Times also gave the film a positive review and wrote, "Yet this isn’t a retooled genre piece, the tale of a guy and his gun, but an amiably idiosyncratic work..."

Pete Vonder Haar of Film Threat gave the film a mixed review and wrote that it "starts off strong, but loses steam towards the end."

References

External links